Aapeli Suomalainen (29 January 1866, Savonranta – 19 September 1932) was a Finnish miller and politician. He was a Member of the Parliament of Finland from 1907 to 1908, representing the Social Democratic Party of Finland (SDP).

References

1866 births
1932 deaths
People from Savonlinna
People from Mikkeli Province (Grand Duchy of Finland)
Social Democratic Party of Finland politicians
Members of the Parliament of Finland (1907–08)